Louis Martin is the name of:

Lou Martin (Louis Michael Martin, 1949–2012), Northern Irish blues and rock pianist
Louis Honore Martin (1895–1920), French World War I flying ace
Louis Martin (lay brother) (1823–1894), French layman and father of a Catholic saint
Louis Martin (settler) (1820–1864), pioneer settler in Gillespie and Mason Counties, Texas
Louis Martin (swimmer) (fl. 1900), swimmer at the 1900 Summer Olympics and water polo player
Louis Martin (Swiss politician) (1838-1912), President of the Swiss National Council (1903/190)
Louis Martin (weightlifter) (1936–2015), British Olympic weightlifter
Louis E. Martin (1912–1997), American journalist
Louis M. Martin (1863–1940), New York politician and judge
Louis St. Martin (1820–1893), Louisiana politician

See also
Lewis Martin (disambiguation)